The men's singles in table tennis at the 2019 Asian Table Tennis Championships in Yogyakarta is the twenty-fourth edition of the event in this tournament. It was held at Among Rogo Sports Hall from 19 to 22 September 2019.

Schedule 
All times are Indonesia Western Standard Time (UTC+07:00)

Draw

Key 

 Q = Qualifier
 w/o = Walkover
 w/d = Withdraw
 r = Retired
 DQ = Disqualified

Finals

Top half

Section 1

Section 2

Section 3

Section 4

Section 5

Section 6

Section 7

Section 8

Bottom half

Section 9

Section 10

Section 11

Section 12

Section 13

Section 14

Section 15

Section 16

References 

Asian Table Tennis Championships
Asian Table Tennis Championships
Table Tennis Championships
Asian Table Tennis Championships
Table tennis competitions in Indonesia
Asian Table Tennis Championships